Tyler Gaffalione (born September 12, 1994 in Davie, Florida) is an American jockey who, since being voted the Eclipse Award for the 2015 U.S. Champion Apprentice Jockey, has become one of racing's rising stars having won more than 200 races every year in his first three full seasons. He won the 2019 Preakness Stakes aboard War of Will.

Background
Born in Davie, Florida, Gaffalione is the son of former jockey Steve Gaffalione, who rode from 1978 through 1998. He was four when he got his first pony and spent much time on the backstretch with his father. Gafflione attended Western and Sunlake High Schools, graduating from the latter in 2013.

Racing career
Tyler Gaffalione rode his first winner in the third race of his career on September 7, 2014 at Gulfstream Park. A track that became a favorite, on May 3, 2015 he won five races on a single Gulfstream Park racecard then on July 4, 2017 he tied Hall of Fame jockey Jerry Bailey's 19-year-old record by winning seven races on a single Gulfstream Park racecard. On June 30, 2018 Tyler Gaffalione captured his sixth riding title at Gulfstream Park.

In 2018, Tyler Gaffalione was riding primarily at Gulfstream Park and Saratoga Race Course. He earned his first Grade I victory in the La Troienne aboard Salty and finished in eleventh place in the National Earnings list.

In 2019, he teamed up with trainer Mark Casse to win the Preakness Stakes with War of Will.

Year-end charts

References

1994 births
living people
American jockeys
Eclipse Award winners
People from Davie, Florida
Sportspeople from Broward County, Florida